The Tsavo Trust is a non-profit wildlife conservation organisation, which covers Tsavo East National Park, Tsavo West National Park, and Chyulu Hills National Park in Kenya.  The trust was founded by Nzioki wa Makau who is chairman of the board, along with Tanya Saunders who is chief executive officer, Ian Saunders chief operations officer, and Richard Moller who is chief conservation officer and pilot.  The started aim of the trust is the protection of wildlife, especially African elephants, and the reduction of the ivory trade. In June 2014, the Tsavo Trust came into the international spotlight when it announced the death of Kenya's iconic and most well-known elephant, Satao, killed by an ivory poacher with a poisoned arrow.

The national parks within this region are managed by Kenya Wildlife Service. Around the parks, but within the Tsavo ecosystem, are a number of small towns, villages, ranches, and farms. Contained in this system is the largest population of African elephants in Kenya, numbering 12,000 as of 2011.

There are a number of critical issues in the Tsavo ecosystem which include: a high rate of poverty among the people in the region, poor access to education and healthcare, degradation of habitat, ethnic conflict over resources, loss of wildlife, and lack of financial and technical resources to deal with these issues.  In this context, the stated mission of the Tsavo Trust is to (1) facilitate the development of community-based wildlife conservancies that mutually benefit both the wildlife and people of this region; (2) enhance wildlife conservation in support of the Kenya Wildlife Service and the community conservancies that they help to develop and thereby create more secure park boundaries to reduce poaching; (3) develop multimedia educational tools to increase public awareness of wildlife conservation issues; and (4) facilitate wildlife animal welfare.

References

External links
Tsavo Trust Official Site
Tsavo East National Park
Tsavo West National Park
Amboseli National Park
Chyulu Hills National Park

Nature conservation organizations based in Africa
Elephant conservation organizations
Environmental organisations based in Kenya
Wildlife conservation in Kenya